Frank Douglas Lewis (born July 4, 1947) is an American former professional football player who was a wide receiver for the Pittsburgh Steelers and Buffalo Bills in the National Football League (NFL) for 13 seasons.

Lewis played college football at Grambling State University and received third-team honors on the 1970 Little All-America college football team.

He was drafted by the Steelers in the first round of the 1971 NFL Draft.  He won two Super Bowl rings with the team, in Super Bowl IX and Super Bowl X.

In August 1978 the Steelers traded Lewis to the Bills in exchange for tight end Paul Seymour.  Seymour was returned by the Steelers when he failed to pass their physical.  Lewis, however, remained with the Bills and the Steelers ended up receiving no compensation in the trade.

Lewis was a Pro Bowl selection in 1981 as a member of the Bills. In his pro career, he caught 397 receptions for 6,724 yards and 40 touchdowns.

In 2019, Lewis was elected to the 10th class of the Black College Football Hall of Fame. As a star player at Grambling State in the Southwestern Athletic Conference, he helped the university win the conference championship in 1968. He scored 42 total touchdowns, both receiving and rushing, during his four years there before becoming a first-round draft pick.

References

Sportspeople from Houma, Louisiana
Players of American football from Louisiana
American football wide receivers
Grambling State Tigers football players
Pittsburgh Steelers players
Buffalo Bills players
American Conference Pro Bowl players
1947 births
Living people